Adrián del Caro is an American historian of German and Austrian literature, currently a Distinguished Humanities Professor at University of Tennessee. He has written several monographs on Friedrich Nietzsche and translated several books by Nietzsche into English.  He received his Ph.D. from the University of Minnesota.

References

Year of birth missing (living people)
Living people
University of Tennessee faculty
21st-century American historians
American male non-fiction writers
University of Minnesota alumni
Place of birth missing (living people)
Nietzsche scholars
Translators of Friedrich Nietzsche
21st-century American male writers